Nimba may refer to:
 Mount Nimba, a mountain along the border of Côte d'Ivoire and Guinea in West Africa
 Nimba County in Liberia
 Nimba, an alternative name for the neem tree